General elections were held in Barbados on 20 January 1999. The result was a landslide victory for the Barbados Labour Party led by Owen Arthur, which won 26 of the 28 seats.  The opposition Democratic Labour Party led by David Thompson, only won two seats. Voter turnout was 63.4%.

At the time, this was the largest margin of victory since universal suffrage was introduced in 1951. This record would be broken in 2018, when the BLP won all 30 seats in the House of Assembly.

Results

References

External links
Constituency results from Adam Carr's Election Archive

Barbados
1999 in Barbados
Elections in Barbados
January 1999 events in North America
Landslide victories